Mindanao rasbora (Rasbora philippina) is a species of ray-finned fish in the genus Rasbora endemic to Mindanao.

References

Rasboras
Freshwater fish of the Philippines
Endemic fauna of the Philippines
Fauna of Mindanao
Fish described in 1880
Taxa named by Albert Günther